is a railway station on the Tobu Kameido Line in Sumida, Tokyo, Japan, operated by the private railway operator Tobu Railway.

Lines

Station layout

The station has two staggered side platforms serving two tracks.

Platforms

Adjacent stations

History
The station opened on 15 April 1928.

From 17 March 2012, station numbering was introduced on Tobu lines, with Omurai Station becoming "TS-41".

Surrounding area
 Mukojima Police Station
Koimari Museum
Koganeyu
Kyunaka River
Yokoamicho Park

See also
 List of railway stations in Japan

References

External links

  

Railway stations in Japan opened in 1928
Railway stations in Tokyo